Stara Bučka is a settlement in the Municipality of Škocjan in southeastern Slovenia, the traditional region of Lower Carniola. Within the municipality, it belongs to the Local Community of Škocjan. It lies between Škocjan and Bučka. The municipality is now included in the Southeast Slovenia Statistical Region.

References

External links
Stara Bučka at Geopedia

Populated places in the Municipality of Škocjan